Toni Jakimovski (born 19 April 1966) is a Macedonian football manager and former player.

Playing career

Club
Born in Tetovo, SR Macedonia, back then within Yugoslavia he played with FK Vardar in the Macedonian First Football League. He played with Vardar in the 1996–97 UEFA Cup.  Earlier he had played in the Yugoslav Second League with FK Teteks between 1982 and 1986 and with FK Radnički Kragujevac in 1988–89.

International
He made one appearance for the Macedonian national team in 1995 in a friendly match against Turkey in Istanbul.

Managerial career
Toni Jakimovski was FK Vardar coach for a short period during the 2003–04 season.  He also managed FK Teteks in the 2009–10 and 2010–11 seasons, FK Gostivar in 2013–14 and FK Gorno Lisiče during the 2014–15 season. In September 2015, Jakimovski became a coach of FK Bregalnica Štip.

On 23 March 2017 he joined Lithuanian A Lyga club Utenis Utena as an assistant manager to Zvezdan Milošević, but left the club in May, month after the Swede was sacked.

Managerial statistics

Honours

Player

Club
Cementarnica 55 
Macedonian Cup:
Winners (1): 2002–03
Runners-up (1): 2001–02

Manager
Teteks 
Macedonian Second League:
Winners (1): 2008-09
Macedonian Cup:
Winners (1): 2009–10
Runners-up (1): 2010–11

References

1966 births
Living people
Sportspeople from Tetovo
Association football defenders
Yugoslav footballers
Macedonian footballers
North Macedonia international footballers
FK Teteks players
FK Radnički 1923 players
FK Ljuboten players
FK Vardar players
Yugoslav Second League players
Macedonian First Football League players
Macedonian football managers
FK Vardar managers
KF Renova managers
FK Teteks managers
KF Gostivari managers
FK Bregalnica Štip managers
FK Utenis Utena non-playing staff
Macedonian expatriate sportspeople in Lithuania